Gasarenda is a small town located in the Nyamagabe District in the Southern province of Rwanda. It is populated mainly by ordinary citizens that live on agriculture and a few businessmen. It is known to be one of the oldest small-scale business towns in the country with income based on agricultural revenues from tea plantations and wood works. It is a home to two main tea factories of Kitabi and Mata.

Populated places in Rwanda